6ter (pronounced: [sister]) is a French television network which is available free-to-air through digital terrestrial television, satellite and DSL. It is a subsidiary of the Groupe M6; the name 6ter has been selected for the channel as M6's little "sister". It is available in France on channel 22.

History 
Following the call of applications of the CSA for the launch of six new channels on the DTT, Groupe M6 presented three projects of channels : 6ter, M6 Boutique & Co and Hexa. On 27 March the CSA chose 6ter to be part of the 6 new channels to be launched on 12 December 2012 in HDTV (1080i). In 2022, the channel would be sold to Altice alongside TFX (owned by TF1 Group).

Like its sisters M6 and W9, 6ter have a Swiss subfeed, which air in Swiss providers and in free-to-air on satellite.

Programming 
6ter's programming is family-oriented. 6ter shows magazines, documentaries, educational programs, along with children programmes, series and movies.

Until June 2016, 6ter had a weekday children morning block named Trop Toon. Since then, a few cartoons have sometimes been broadcast, notably Tintin.

 90210 (90210 Beverly Hills : Nouvelle Génération, seasons 4–5, season 1–3 in syndication)
 Buffy the Vampire Slayer (Buffy contre les vampires, HD version, SD version in syndication)
 Extant (season 2, season 1 in syndication)
 Family Blagues
 Fresh Off the Boat (Bienvenue chez les Huang)
 Grease: Live
 Jane the Virgin (since season 2, season 1 in syndication)
 King & Maxwell
 The Messengers
 Modern Family (since season 6, season 1–5 in syndication)
 Off the Map (Off the Map : Urgences au bout du monde)
 Once Upon a Time (season 3 and 5 only, other seasons in syndication)
 Reign (Reign : Le destin d'une reine)
 Sleepy Hollow (since season 2, season 1 in syndication)
 Switched at Birth (Switched)
 Witches of East End
 Zero Hour

Syndicated programming 

 8 Simple Rules (Touche pas à mes filles)
 The Adventures of Tintin (Les Aventures de Tintin)
 Arme Millionäre (Pauvres Millionnaires)
 Band of Brothers
 Caméra Café
 Charmed
 Crisis
 Der Clown (Le Clown)
 Desperate Housewives
 Dinotopia (miniseries)
 Dinotopia: The Series (Dinotopia)
 Dr. Quinn, Medicine Woman (Docteur Quinn, femme médecin)
 Emily Owens, M.D. (Dr Emily Owens)
 Face au doute
 Geronimo Stilton
 The Good Wife
 Kaamelott
 Kid Paddle
 Kyle XY
 Largo Winch
 Le Petit Nicolas
 Les Blagues de Toto
 Les Cordier, juge et flic
 Les Nouvelles Aventures de Lucky Luke
 Life Is Wild
 Little House on the Prairie (La Petite Maison dans la prairie)
 Lou !
 The Magic Roundabout (2007, Le Manège enchanté)
 Malcolm in the Middle (Malcolm)
 Martial Law (Le Flic de Shanghaï)
 Martine
 Martin Mystery (Martin Mystère)
 Melrose Place (Melrose Place : Nouvelle Génération)
 Murder Rooms: The Dark Beginnings of Sherlock Holmes (Les Mystères du véritable Sherlock Holmes)
 My Wife and Kids (Ma famille d'abord)
 The Nanny (Une nounou d'enfer)
 No Ordinary Family  (Super Hero Family)
 Numbers
 Paris 16e
 Prehistoric Park
 The Pretender (Le Caméléon)
 Primeval (Nick Cutter et les Portes du temps)
 Raising Hope
 Relic Hunter (Sydney Fox, l'aventurière)
 Robin Hood (Robin des Bois)
 Sherlock Holmes
 Smallville
 Sous le soleil
 Step by Step (Notre belle famille)
 Terra Nova
 Touch
 Un gars, une fille
 Un Paso Adelante (Un, dos, tres)
 Victoire Bonnot

References

External links
 

Television stations in France
French-language television stations
Television channels and stations established in 2012
2012 establishments in France
RTL Group